Cameron is a given name in the English language. It is a popular unisex name in North America, Australia, New Zealand and the UK. Cameron is ranked as a top 50 name for boys in Scotland.

The name originates from the Scottish surname Cameron.

A variant spelling of the given name is Camron. Modern variants of the name are Kameron, Kamron and Camryn. A shortened form of the given name Cameron is Cam.

People with the given name and variants

Male
Saint Cameron (or Camerinus, Anglicized as "Cameron" despite etymological differences), martyred in 303 under Emperor Diocletian.
Cameron Achord, American football coach
Cameron Alborzian (born 1967), British-Iranian therapist and model
Cameron M. Alexander (1932–2018), American Baptist church and community leader
Cameron Allan (1955–2013), Australian-born American composer and record producer
Cameron Ambridge (born 1978), Australian stuntman
Cameron Anderson (1857–1926), Canadian politician
Cameron Ansell (born 1992), Canadian voice actor
Cameron Argetsinger (1921–2001), American lawyer and auto racing executive
Cameron Artigliere (born 1990), German footballer
Cameron Artis-Payne (born 1990), American football player
Cameron Ayers (born 1991), American basketball player
Cameron Baerg (born 1972), Canadian rower
Cameron Bailey, Canadian film critic and festival programmer
Cameron Baird (1981–2013), Australian soldier
Cameron Bairstow (born 1990), Australian basketballer
Cameron Bancroft (disambiguation)
Cameron Barr, Australian rules football umpire
Cameron McVicar Batjer (1919–2011), American lawyer
Cameron Batson (born 1995), American football player
Cameron Bayly (born 1990), Australian cyclist
Cameron Beaubier (born 1992), American motorcycle racer
Cameron Beckman (born 1970), American golfer
Cameron Belford (born 1988), English footballer
Cameron Bell, New Zealand rugby coach
Cameron Bender (born 1974), American actor
Cameron Blades (born 1971), Australian rugby union player
Cameron Blair (born 1966), Australian rugby league player
Cameron Boardman (born 1970), Australian politician
Cameron Bolton (born 1990), Australian snowboarder
Cameron Borgas (born 1983), Australian cricketer
Cameron Borthwick-Jackson (born 1997), English footballer
Cameron Boyce (1999–2019), American actor
Cameron Boyce (born 1989), Australian cricketer
Cameron Boyle, Scottish rugby union player
Cameron Bradfield (born 1987), American football player
Cameron Brannagan (born 1996), English football player
Cameron Brate (born 1991), American football player
Cameron Brewer (born 1973), New Zealand politician
Cameron Bright (born 1993), Canadian actor
Cameron Britton (born 1986), American actor
Cameron Brown, disambiguation
Cameron Bruce (born 1979), Australian Rules footballer
Cameron Bryce (born 1995), Scottish curler
Cameron Buchanan, disambiguation
Cameron Burgess (born 1995), Australian footballer
Cameron Burrell (1994–2021), American sprinter
Cameron Carpenter (born 1981), American organist
Cameron Carr (disambiguation), multiple people
Cameron Carter-Vickers (born 1997), American footballer
Cameron Cartio (born 1978), Swedish singer of Persian origin
Cameron Chalmers (born 1997), British sprinter
Cameron Champ (born 1995), American golfer
Cameron Chism (born 1990), American football player
Cameron Ciraldo (born 1984), Australian rugby league coach
Cameron Clapp (born 1986), American athlete
Cameron Clark (disambiguation), multiple people
Cameron Clayton (born 1993), American drag queen, better known by his stage name Farrah Moan
Cameron Clear (born 1993), American football player
Cameron Cloke (born 1984), Australian rules footballer
Cameron Clyne (born 1968), Australian businessman
Cameron Cobbold, 1st Baron Cobbold (1904–1987), British banker
Cameron Coetzer (born 1995), South African badminton player
Cameron Cogburn (born 1986), American cyclist
Cameron Collins (born 1989), American football player
Cameron Colvin (born 1986), American football player
Cameron Coxe (born 1998), Welsh footballer
Cameron Crowe (born 1957), American writer and film director
Cameron Daddo (born 1965), Australian actor, musician and presenter
Cameron Dallas (born 1994), American film actor
Cameron Dantzler (born 1998), American football player
Cameron Darkwah (born 1992), English footballer
Cameron Das (born 2000), American racing driver
Cameron Davidson (born 1955), American photographer
Cameron Davis (disambiguation)
Cameron Dawson (born 1995), English footballer
Cameron Dicker (born 2000), American football player
Cameron Dollar (born 1975), American basketball player and coach
Cameron Douglas (born 1978), American actor
Cameron Duodu (born 1937), Ghanaian novelist, journalist, editor and broadcaster
Cameron Dye (born 1959), American actor
Cameron Edwards (born 1995), Australian footballer
Cameron Giles (born 1976), American rapper, best known by his stage name Cam'ron
Cameron Goode (born 1998), American football player
Cameron Hawley (1905–1969), American author
Cameron Heyward (born 1989), American football player
Cameron Hunt (born 1994), American football player
Cameron Jerome (born 1986), English professional footballer
Cameron Jordan (born 1989), Defensive end for the American football team the New Orleans Saints
Cameron Kasky (born 2000), Marjory Stoneman Douglas High School shooting survivor and gun control activist
Cameron Kerry (born 1950), American politician
Cameron Knowles (born 1982), New Zealand soccer player
Cameron Krutwig (born 1998), American basketball player
Cameron Latu (born 2000), American football player
Cameron Ling (born 1981), Australian Rules footballer
Cameron Long (born 1988), American basketball player in the Israeli Premier League
Cameron Mackintosh (born 1946), British theatrical producer
Cameron Mathison (born 1969), Canadian-American actor
Cameron McEvoy (born 1994), Australian swimmer
Cameron McGrone (born 2000), American football player
Cameron McInnes (born 1994), Australian Rugby League player
Cameron Mitchell (1918–1994), American actor
Cameron Monaghan (born 1993), American actor
Cameron Mooney (born 1979), Australian Rules footballer
Cameron McNeish Scottish wilderness hiker, backpacker and mountain walker
Cameron A. Morrison (1869–1953), American politician
Cameron Murray (disambiguation), several people
Cameron Munster (born 1994), Australian rugby league player
Cameron "Cam" Neely (born 1965), Canadian professional hockey player, actor and general manager of the Boston Bruins
Cameron "Cam" Newton, (born 1989), professional quarterback for the New England Patriots
Cameron Nizialek (born 1995), American football player
Cameron Norrie British professional tennis player
Cameron Peck (born 1991), American amateur golfer
Cameron Richardson (footballer) (born 1987), Australian rules footballer
Cameron Rokhsar, American dermatologist
Cameron Sample (born 1999), American football player
Cameron Sexton (born 1970), American politician 
Cameron Sharp (born 1958), Scottish former sprinter
Cameron Smith (disambiguation), multiple people
Cameron Stout (born 1971), Scottish television show contestant
Cameron Sutton (born 1995), American football player
Cameron Talbot (born 1987), Canadian ice hockey player
Cameron Thomas (born 2001), American basketball player
Cameron Thomas (American football) (born 2000), American football player
Cameron Thompson (born 1960), Australian politician
Cameron Toshack (born 1970), Welsh footballer
Cam Ward (born 1984), professional goalie for the Carolina Hurricanes
Cameron Bethel Ware (1913–1999), Canadian major general
Cameron Waters (born 1994) Australian race car driver
Cameron Wood (born 1987), Australian rules footballer

Female
Cameron (wrestler) (born 1987), stage name of American wrestler Ariane Nicole Andrew
Camren Bicondova (born 1999), American actress and dancer
Cameron Castleberry (born 1995), American association footballer
Cameron Diaz (born 1972), American actress
Camryn Manheim (born 1961), American actress
Cameron Richardson (born 1979), American actress and model
Cameron Russell (born 1987), American fashion model

Fictional characters
 Cameron Black, the main character in the television series Deception
 Cameron Chase, a DC Comics character better known as Chase
 Cameron Coleman, a character in Vought News Network: Seven on 7 with Cameron Coleman and the third season of The Boys
 Cameron Davenport, a character from Family Affairs
 Cameron Davis, a character from Days of Our Lives
 Cameron Frye, a character in Ferris Bueller's Day Off
 Cameron Howe, a character in the television series Halt and Catch Fire
 Cameron Kelsey, the main character in Malorie Blackman's novel Pig-Heart Boy
 Cameron Mitchell (Stargate), in the television series Stargate SG-1
 Cameron Phillips, a character in Terminator: The Sarah Connor Chronicles
 Cameron Tucker, in the television series Modern Family
 Cameron Watanabe, the Green Samurai Ranger from Power Rangers: Ninja Storm
 Cameron Corduroy Wilkins, a character from Total Drama: Revenge of the Island
 Cameron (Hollyoaks)

See also
Cam (name), given name and surname

References

English masculine given names
English unisex given names
English-language unisex given names
Given names originating from a surname
Scottish unisex given names
Unisex given names
Given names